Jimmy Reagan (1888-1975) was an American boxer who claimed the World Bantamweight Championship in a twelve-round bout on January 29, 1909 against Jimmy Walsh at Dreamland Rink in San Francisco, California. He lost the title only a month later in an historic twenty round bout on February 22, 1909 to Monte Attell at the Mission Street Arena in San Francisco. Reagan's primary manager was Jack Davis. During his career he fought Battling Nelson, Peanuts Sinclair, future lightweight champion Willie Ritchie, World Feather and Lightweight contender "Mexican Joe" Rivers and reigning lightweight champion Benny Leonard.

Career before the championship
Jimmy Reagan's birthdate is unconfirmed. The Evening standard stated in October 1910 that Reagan was 21 years old. While The Salt Lake tribune stated he was 23 years old in February 1911. While the papers contradict each other, as Reagan couldn't be 21 in late 1910 and 23 in early 1911, they both leave the possibility of Reagan being born in 1888 making that the most likely birthdate. He was born of both Irish and Italian descent, with his father being Irish, and his mother Italian.  He began fighting professionally around late 1907 in the Oakland, California area, and won all but two of his first nine fights in the following year, primarily in short four and six round bouts.

On July 16, 1908, in a rare early career loss he met the gifted Willie Ritchie at the Reliance Athletic Club in Oakland, California, and came up on the short end of a six-round points decision.  Ritchie was one of the most accomplished opponents Reagan would meet in his early career and would hold the World Lightweight Title from 1912 to 1914.

He met Monte Attell for the first time on November 30, 1908 in an important fifteen-round draw at the Dreamland Pavilion in Oakland.

World Bantamweight champion

On January 29, 1909, Reagan met Jimmy Walsh at the Dreamland Rink in San Francisco for a twelve-round World Bantamweight Title match.  According to the Oakland Tribune, "Reagan led in every one of the twelve rounds with Walsh and was entitled to the verdict," though admitting the "title was a very close one."

Joe Woodman, Walsh's manager, admitted that Walsh had been beaten in eight of the twelve rounds, though it was a surprise to much of the audience who believed that Reagan had been overmatched with Walsh in the days before the fight. Walsh was considered to have a more clever boxing form and finesse, particularly in the early rounds, but Reagan was the aggressor, delivering more blows, and taking the initiative in the final rounds. Three days after taking the World Bantamweight Championship, he was signed to appear in a local Vaudeville House at a salary of $250 a week, an impressive sum for the era.

Loss of Bantamweight Title
On February 22, 1909, he lost to Monte Attell in a thrilling twenty round title fight at the Mission Street Arena in San Francisco.  In the first six rounds the fighting was quite close, with Attell down four times in the early rounds. Reagan was down twice in the eighth, once for a nine count. Reagan knocked down Attell with a right to the jaw just as the bell sounded ending the sixth round, but Attell recovered, though dazed by the blow.  According to the Oakland Tribune, Attell took every round from the eighth through the twentieth.

On August 8, 1909, he finally lost the World Bantamweight Title to the exceptional Attell, brother to World Featherweight Champion Abe, in a fourth of ten-round knockout in Oakland, California only seven months after taking the title.  The bout was billed as the 115 pound World Bantamweight championship. Reagan was able to hold his title for only one month.  Perhaps if he had the opportunity to meet challengers less skilled and dominant than Monte Attell, he would have held the title far longer, but Attell was a local boxer and would not be denied his chance.

Bouts after losing bantamweight title
On September 5, 1910, he defeated Peanuts Sinclair in a thirteen-round knockout at the Fair Grounds in Ogden, Utah on what was then Labor Day.  The fight was billed as an "Inter-Mountain Featherweight Championship", though Sinclair was not a featherweight of great national prominence.  He trained at the Hermitage at Ogden Canyon for the well publicized bout, and told the press he would consider retiring if he lost the bout. Sinclair's training at Willard Bean's Gymnasium included pulley work, a form of strength training, shadow boxing, club swinging, and rope dancing.  Apparently Reagan was accurate in his belief that he had an edge in the match. A very large crowd was expected to attend the bout.  Reagan worked out with the punching bag, skipping rope, medicine ball, and sand bag.

On October 7, 1910, he lost to Gene McGovern in the Fairgrounds in Ogden, Utah, in an eleventh round disqualification. The original call was a knockout by Reagan, but upon closer examination, the Referee Tom Painter ruled that Reagan had hit McGovern below the belt.  After consulting with three physicians who examined McGovern, Painter made the binding ruling and awarded the bout to McGovern, reversing the rule of a knockout by Reagan.  A crowd of 1500 witnessed the vigorous bout that saw Reagan dominating in every round.  McGovern was counted out after he had laid down after the final blow. The bout was to have been for the Inter-Mountain Featherweight Championship.

Loss to "Mexican Joe" Rivers
On February 22, 1911, he lost to Mexican Joe Rivers by a technical knockout in the thirteenth round of a scheduled twenty.  Reagan took a "terrific beating" and was knocked down four times prior to the thirteenth round when he was knocked down twice more by Rivers before the fight was called by Referee Eyeton. The bout took place in the Arena in Vernon, California, considered in the city of Los Angeles.  The referee was Charles Eyton.  Rivers would contend for the World Lightweight Title on July 4, 1913 against Willie Ritchie.  He would fight many of the top feather and lightweight boxers in the country.

He fought Monte Attell again in a draw bout on July 25, 1911, at the Buffalo Athletic Club in Sacramento, California.

He fought "Chalky" Germaine twice, first on January 8, 1912, in what was to be a ten-round bout at the Colonial Theatre in Salt Lake City, Utah.  Reagan was having trouble making the 122 pound limit for the bout.  Nevertheless, he won the bout in the fifth round on points. Germaine was losing throughout the bout, and was clearly still suffering from a previous illness.  Referee Harding K. Downing stopped the bout in the fifth round as a result. He met Germaine again on July 24, 1912 in Price, Utah, in a 20-round draw.

He defeated Tally Johns on September 4, 1912, at the Salt Lake Theatre in Salt Lake City, Utah, in an uncharacteristic fourteenth-round TKO of a twenty-round match. Johns was described by one source as a "featherweight champion of the Northwest."<ref>"Classy Little Boxers to Go Twenty Rounds Tonight", The Salt Lake Tribune", Salt Lake City, Utah, pg. 7, 4 September 1912</ref> Johns ended the bout with one eye badly swollen and the other entirely shut.  Suffering, he had his seconds stop the bout forty-five seconds into the fourteenth round. Reagan was described as the aggressor throughout the bout, but not a single knockdown of either boxer occurred in the fight.

Between October 1913 and February 1915, he fought Sally Salvadore three times, winning in each bout.

On November 5, 1915, he won against the great Battling Nelson in a ten-round points decision in Kansas City, Missouri.  Nelson, the former lightweight champion, lost decisively, and took serious punishment.

Decline of boxing career
Between August 1916, and May 1919, he began losing bouts with greater frequency, winning only 1 of 14 of his late career bouts. Though a number of the boxers he met after his loss of the title were competent or even gifted, his boxing dominance was relatively brief for a former World Champion.

Match with Benny Leonard
Near the end of his boxing career, on February 28, 1917, he fought the exceptional reigning lightweight champion Benny Leonard at the Manhattan Casino in Manhattan, New York, in a ten-round match, that the New York Times considered a draw bout.  The Des Moines Register considered the fact that Reagan had gone ten rounds without being knocked out by the extraordinary champion a remarkable accomplishment.  According to the Ogden Standard, "Dozens of times Jimmy seemed on the point of going down, but always he kept afoot. The Standard also wrote of Leonard, that "there wasn't a punch that he didn't aim at Reagan, and there wasn't one that was forceful enough to keep the Californian at bay.""To Stage Athletic Show", Des Moines Register, Des Moines, Iowa, pg. 31, 13 January 1918

Loss to Arlos Fanning
On November 20, 1917, he lost decisively to Arlos Fanning in a fifteen-round points decision in Joplin, Missouri.  Fanning scored a clear knockdown of Reagan in the fourth, and had leads in twelve rounds, while Reagan took only two rounds, with one was a draw.  On November 7, 1917, while in St. Louis training for the bout at the Future City Boxing club, Regan was briefly arrested and then released.  Several policeman were able to purchase boxing tickets to a boxing event sponsored by the club, without having club membership, which was legally required to purchase tickets.  When such violations occurred the boxers present at a club were arrested.

Of his late career loss to Black boxer Willie St. Clair on January 8, 1918, the Ogden Standard'' accurately predicted "As a fighter Reagan is through, Undoubtedly he is tough and can take a terrific beating, but for real milling his days apparently are over.  Willie won the decision by a mile."

He lost to Neal Allison January 15, 1918 at the Waterloo Theatre in Waterloo, Iowa in a ten-round newspaper decision.  Reagan was characterized as a boxer who lacked great scientific boxing skills, being rather "a scrapper of the give and take variety, who relied on his ability to "give and take punishment to bring ...victory."

Reagan died in October 1975.

Professional boxing record
All information in this section is derived from BoxRec, unless otherwise stated.

Official record

All newspaper decisions are officially regarded as “no decision” bouts and are not counted in the win/loss/draw column.

Unofficial record

Record with the inclusion of newspaper decisions in the win/loss/draw column.

See also
List of bantamweight boxing champions

References

External links 
 
 Jimmy Reagan - Cyber Boxing Zone

|-

1975 deaths
Irish male boxers
Bantamweight boxers
American people of Irish descent
World boxing champions
World bantamweight boxing champions
1891 births
American male boxers
People from San Francisco
Boxers from California